Jigsaw is the sixth and the first fully instrumental rock album by the Shadows. A British instrumental (and sometimes vocal) group.It was released in 1967 through EMI Records.

Track listing

Personnel 
Hank Marvin - Lead guitar and mandolin
Bruce Welch - Rhythm guitar
John Rostill - Bass guitar
Brian Bennett - Drums and percussion
Norrie Paramor - Producer

Charts

References 

1967 albums
The Shadows albums
EMI Columbia Records albums
Albums produced by Norrie Paramor